Chalam Parunchai (ฉลาม พรัญชัย) is a Thai Muay Thai fighter.

Titles and accomplishments

 2015 Channel 7 Stadium 122 lbs Champion
 2017 Lumpinee Stadium 126 lbs Champion
 2020 Lumpinee Stadium 126 lbs Champion
 2021 Channel 7 Stadium 130 lbs Champion

Fight record

|-  style="background:#cfc;"
| 2023-01-28||  Win ||align=left| Petchdam Petchyindee Academy ||Suek Muay Mahakuson Samakom Chao Paktai  || Bangkok, Thailand ||Decision  ||5 ||3:00 
|-  style="background:#cfc;"
| 2022-11-18 || Win ||align=left| Flukenoi Kiatfahlikit || Ruamponkon + Prachin || Prachinburi province, Thailand || Decision  ||5 ||3:00
|-  style="background:#cfc"
| 2022-08-13 || Win ||align=left| Petchsukhumvit Boybangna || Ruamponkon Samui, Petchbuncha Stadium || Ko Samui, Thailand || Decision ||  5|| 3:00
|-  style="background:#cfc;"
| 2021-12-13||Win ||align=left| Phetwason Boybangna || Kanla Krang Neung, Rajadamnern Stadium || Bangkok, Thailand ||Decision ||  5|| 3:00

|-  style="background:#cfc;"
| 2021-04-11|| Win ||align=left| ET Tded99 || Channel 7 Stadium || Bangkok, Thailand || Decision || 5 || 3:00
|- 
! style=background:white colspan=9 |
|-  style="background:#cfc;"
| 2020-09-13|| Win ||align=left| View Petchkoson || Channel 7 Stadium || Bangkok, Thailand || Decision || 5 || 3:00
|-  style="background:#cfc;"
| 2020-03-06|| Win ||align=left| View Petchkoson || Lumpinee Stadium || Bangkok, Thailand || Decision || 5 || 3:00
|- 
! style=background:white colspan=9 |
|-  style="background:#cfc;"
| 2020-01-31|| Win ||align=left| Chorfah Tor.Sangtiennoi || Phuket Super Fight Real MuayThai || Phuket Province, Thailand || Decision || 5 || 3:00
|-  style="background:#cfc;"
| 2019-11-14|| Win||align=left| Mongkolchai Kwaitonggym || Rajadamnern Stadium || Bangkok, Thailand || Decision || 5 || 3:00
|-  style="background:#fbb;"
| 2019-10-05|| Loss ||align=left| Kiewpayak Jitmuangnon || Suek Muay Thai Vithee Isaan Tai || Buriram, Thailand || Decision || 5 || 3:00

|-  style="background:#c5d2ea;"
| 2019-08-18|| Draw ||align=left| Messi Pangkongprab || Rajadamnern Stadium || Bangkok, Thailand || Decision || 5 || 3:00
|-  style="background:#fbb;"
| 2019-06-26|| Loss ||align=left| Kiewpayak Jitmuangnon ||  RuamponkonSamui + Kiatpetch Super Fight || Surat Thani Province, Thailand || KO (Left elbow) || 3 ||
|-  style="background:#cfc;"
| 2019-05-29|| Win ||align=left| Detsakda PhuKongYatSuepUdomSuk || Rajadamnern Stadium || Bangkok, Thailand || KO (Left elbow) || 3 ||
|-  style="background:#cfc;"
| 2019-02-12|| Win ||align=left| Messi Pangkongprab || Lumpinee Stadium || Bangkok, Thailand || Decision || 5 || 3:00
|-  style="background:#cfc;"
| 2018-12-11|| Win ||align=left| Siwakon Kiatjaroenchai  ||Lumpinee Stadium || Bangkok, Thailand || Decision || 5 || 3:00
|- 
! style=background:white colspan=9 |
|-  style="background:#fbb;"
| 2018-09-12|| Loss ||align=left| Chanasuk Kor.Kampanath ||Rajadamnern Stadium || Bangkok, Thailand || Decision || 5 || 3:00
|-  style="background:#cfc;"
| 2018-08-02|| Win ||align=left| Chanasuk Kor.Kampanath ||Rajadamnern Stadium || Bangkok, Thailand || Decision || 5 || 3:00
|-  style="background:#fbb;"
| 2018-06-25|| Loss||align=left| Mongkolchai Kwaitonggym || Birthday Nayok-A-Thasala + Kiatpetch || Nakhon Si Thammarat, Thailand || Decision || 5 || 3:00
|-  style="background:#cfc;"
| 2018-03-28|| Win ||align=left| Prajanchai P.K.Saenchaimuaythaigym || WanParunchai + Poonseua Sanjorn  || Nakhon Si Thammarat, Thailand || Decision || 5 || 3:00
|-  style="background:#fbb;"
| 2017-12-08|| Loss ||align=left| Ronachai Tor.Ramintra || Lumpinee Stadium || Bangkok, Thailand || Decision || 5 || 3:00
|-  style="background:#cfc;"
| 2017-11-07|| Win ||align=left| Messi Pangkongprab || Lumpinee Stadium || Bangkok, Thailand || Decision || 5 || 3:00
|- 
! style=background:white colspan=9 |
|-  style="background:#cfc;"
| 2017-07-14|| Win ||align=left| Sprinter Pangkongprab || || Ko Samui, Thailand || Decision || 5 || 3:00
|-  style="background:#fbb;"
| 2017-06-09|| Loss ||align=left| Tawanchai PK Saenchaimuaythaigym || Lumpinee Stadium || Bangkok, Thailand || Decision || 5 || 3:00
|-  style="background:#fbb;"
| 2016-09-30|| Loss ||align=left| Suakim PK Saenchaimuaythaigym || Lumpinee Stadium || Bangkok, Thailand || Decision || 5 || 3:00
|- 
! style=background:white colspan=9 |
|-  style="background:#cfc;"
| 2016-08-24|| Win ||align=left| Phet Sawansangmanja ||Rajadamnern Stadium || Bangkok, Thailand || Decision || 5 || 3:00
|- style="background:#fbb;"
| 2016-07-08|| Loss ||align=left| Panpayak Jitmuangnon || Lumpinee Stadium || Bangkok, Thailand || TKO (High kick) || 2 ||
|-  style="background:#cfc;"
| 2016-06-09|| Win ||align=left| Yodmungkol Muangsima || Rajadamnern Stadium || Bangkok, Thailand || Decision || 5 || 3:00
|-  style="background:#cfc;"
| 2016-04-29|| Win ||align=left| Prajanchai P.K.Saenchaimuaythaigym || Lumpinee Stadium || Bangkok, Thailand || Decision || 5 || 3:00
|-  style="background:#cfc;"
| 2016-04-05|| Win ||align=left| Yardfa R-Airlines ||Lumpinee Stadium || Bangkok, Thailand || Decision || 5 || 3:00
|-  style="background:#cfc;"
| 2016-03-04|| Win ||align=left| Prajanchai P.K.Saenchaimuaythaigym || Lumpinee Stadium || Bangkok, Thailand || Decision || 5 || 3:00
|-  style="background:#cfc;"
| 2015-12-13|| Win ||align=left| Phet or.Pimonsri || Channel 7 Stadium || Bangkok, Thailand || KO (Knees)|| 3 || 
|- 
! style=background:white colspan=9 |
|-  style="background:#cfc;"
| 2015-11-10|| Win ||align=left| Sprinter Pangkongprab ||Lumpinee Stadium || Bangkok, Thailand || Decision || 5 || 3:00
|-  style="background:#cfc;"
| 2015-10-11|| Win ||align=left| Satanfah Eminentair || Channel 7 Stadium || Bangkok, Thailand || Decision || 5 || 3:00
|-  style="background:#fbb;"
| 2015-07-29|| Loss ||align=left| Jakdao Witsanukonkan || || Songkhla, Thailand || Decision || 5 || 3:00
|-  style="background:#cfc;"
| ? || Win||align=left| Serbin Kiatjaroenchai || || Bangkok, Thailand || KO ||  ||
|-  style="background:#cfc;"
| ? || Win||align=left| Design Rachanon || || Bangkok, Thailand || KO ||  ||
|-  style="background:#cfc;"
| ? || Win||align=left| Chalongchai Kiatjaroenchai || || Bangkok, Thailand || Decision || 5 || 3:00 
|-
| colspan=9 | Legend:

References

1993 births
Chalam Parunchai
Living people